State Route 449 (SR 449) is a  north–south state highway in Sevier County, within the eastern part of the U.S. state of Tennessee. It travels from US 411 (Dolly Parton Parkway) overlaying Veterans Boulevard and some of Middle Creek Road in Sevierville south to US 441/US 321 (Parkway) in Pigeon Forge. It serves as a bypass around the busy tourist areas in Sevierville and Pigeon Forge.

SR 449 is a more direct route to Dollywood and Dollywood's Splash Country when traveling from the north. This route avoids the congested traffic areas along the Great Smoky Mountains Parkway through Sevierville and Pigeon Forge.

Route description

SR 449 begins as Dollywood Lane at an intersection with US 321/US 441/SR 71/SR 73 (Parkway) in Pigeon Forge. It travels to the northeast as a 4-lane undivided highway, crossing over the West Prong Little Pigeon River, before making a wide curve to the northwest, where Dollywood Lane splits off and SR 449 begins following Veterans Boulevard. Then, it curves to the north to have an intersection with Teaster Lane before passing through some hills to have an intersection with McCarter Hollow Road, which provides access to Dollywood and Dollywood's Splash Country. The highway then widens to a 6-Lane divided highway and begins passing through rural areas before entering the Sevierville city limits. SR 449 continues north through rural areas to have an intersection with Collier Drive before coming to an end at an intersection with US 411/SR 35 (Dolly Parton Parkway) just east of downtown near the Gatlinburg-Pigeon Forge Airport.

History

When SR 449 was initially built, it was only signed as Veterans Boulevard with the hidden designation of SR 449, with it being a secondary highway at the time. It has since been resigned, as of July 2013, as SR 449, with the designation being changed to a primary highway.

Major intersections

See also
 
 
 List of state routes in Tennessee

References

External links
 Official Tennessee State Highway Map (2011)

449
Transportation in Sevier County, Tennessee